The Siboga snake eel (Bascanichthys sibogae) is an eel from the family Ophichthidae (worm/snake eels). It was described by Max Carl Wilhelm Weber in 1913, originally under the genus Callechelys. It is a marine, tropical eel which is found off the south coast of Timor, Indonesia, in the western central Pacific Ocean.

References

Ophichthidae
Fish described in 1913